Sidi Ahmed al-Rgibi (also Er Reguibi and other spellings) was an Arab Sahrawi Islamic preacher and political leader from Beni Hassan tribe, in the tribal areas of the north-western Sahara desert in the 16th century. He was born in 1590 in El Kharaouiaa. He was considered a holy man and an idrissid, or descendant of Muhammad. He died at the age of 75.

He is the founder of the Reguibat, the largest and most powerful Sahrawi tribe, whose areas extended from Western Sahara into modern-day Mauritania, Morocco and Algeria.

His shrine, located in the northern Saguia el Hamra region of Western Sahara, is still visited every year by thousands of visitors.

References

1590 births
1660s deaths
Sahrawi religious leaders
Sahrawi Sunni Muslims
Year of death unknown